Pareuxesta latifasciata is a species of ulidiid or picture-winged fly in the genus Pareuxesta of the family Ulidiidae.

References

Ulidiidae